WQYK may refer to:

 WQYK-FM, a radio station (99.5 FM) licensed to St. Petersburg, Florida, United States
 WHFS (AM), a radio station (1010 AM) licensed to Seffner, Florida, which held the call sign WQYK from 1988 to 2004, and again from 2006 to 2012